Alexandra "Aleka" Papariga (née Drosou; ; born 5 November 1945) is a Greek retired politician who served the Communist Party of Greece (KKE) as its General Secretary from 1991 to 2013. She is the first woman to be General Secretary of KKE, and thus the first woman to head a major political party in Greece.

Early years 
Papariga was born in Athens in 1945. Her parents, Nikos Drosos and Kiki Drosou were National Resistance fighters and members of Communist Party of Greece (KKE), of Cephalonian origin.

She graduated from the Historical-Archeological Section of the Philosophy Faculty of Athens University and after graduation worked as an employee for eight years in various accounting offices. At the same time, she worked as a private tutor. Since 1976 she has worked exclusively in party and social activities.

Political career 
Papariga started out as an activist in the peace movement in 1961 and soon after joined the pupils' organization of the youth section of the United Democratic Left (EDA). She was active in various school and student movements until the military coup in 1967. Throughout this period, she was a member of the Bureau of the EDA youth section pupils' organization and then of the "Lambrakis" Democratic Youth Students’ organization Bureau.

Military junta
She joined KKE in 1968, while it was illegal during the Greek military junta and was active in the prisoners' families' movement.

Third Hellenic Republic 
After the end of the military junta, she became a member of the Bureau of the City Committee of the Athens Party Organization (KOA), and was also active in the women's movement. A founding member of the Women's Federation of Greece, she participated in the organization of national events for International Women's Day. She was a leading member of the women's movement until 1981, and then active in the Athens Party Organization up to 1991. During her activities in the women's movement, she participated in international congresses of the Women's International Democratic Federation, the United Nations, and many international conferences and symposia.

Papariga has been a member of the Central Committee of KKE since the 10th Congress (May 1978) and of the Politburo of the CC since 1986. On 27 February 1991 at the 13th Party Congress, she was elected as Secretary-General of the KKE. She was unanimously re-elected as Secretary-General on 26 May 1996, at the 15th Party Congress. In February 2009, Papariga was re-elected as Secretary-General at the 18th Party Congress. This re-election made her the longest serving General Secretary of the KKE.

As a KKE candidate in Athens B constituency, Papariga was elected to the Hellenic Parliament in 1993 election. On 12 January 2023, it was announced that she would not be a parliamentary candidate and that she would retire from politics after the 2023 election.

Personal life 
She married the journalist Thanasis Paparigas, with whom she had a daughter, Vasileia, and another child who died at the age of three. Her husband died on October 11, 2002, after being seriously injured in a car accident.

References

External links

 Short biographic note website of the Communist Party of Greece
 

1945 births
Living people
Members of the Lambrakis Democratic Youth
National and Kapodistrian University of Athens alumni
Stalinism
Anti-revisionists
Greek women writers
Communist women writers
Socialist feminists
General Secretaries of the Communist Party of Greece
Greek MPs 1993–1996
Greek MPs 1996–2000
Greek MPs 2000–2004
Greek MPs 2004–2007
Greek MPs 2007–2009
Greek MPs 2009–2012
Greek MPs 2012 (May)
Greek MPs 2012–2014
Greek MPs 2015 (February–August)
Greek MPs 2015–2019
20th-century Greek politicians
20th-century Greek women politicians
21st-century Greek politicians
21st-century Greek women politicians
Politicians from Athens
Greek MPs 2019–2023